William C. B. Sewell House, also known as the Sewell-Freese House, is a historic home located at Covington, Fountain County, Indiana. It was built in 1867, and is a -story, three bay, Italianate style brick dwelling.  It has two wings and a separate summer kitchen.  The front facade features a full-width, one-story decorative front porch and a pair of cast-iron lions.

It was listed on the National Register of Historic Places in 1984.

References

Houses on the National Register of Historic Places in Indiana
Italianate architecture in Indiana
Houses completed in 1867
Houses in Fountain County, Indiana
National Register of Historic Places in Fountain County, Indiana